Rhabdops aquaticus, also known as the water rhabdops and aquatic rhabdops,  is a nonvenomous aquatic species of snake. It is endemic to the Western Ghats in southern Maharashtra, northern Karnataka, and Goa states, India. It has an off-white belly and black spots on its olive brown skin; juveniles are olive green, with yellow undersides.

References

aquaticus
Snakes of Asia
Reptiles of India
Endemic fauna of the Western Ghats
Reptiles described in 2017
Taxa named by Veerappan Deepak
Taxa named by Varad B. Giri
Taxa named by David J. Gower